The Kerala State Planning Board is an advisory board under the Government of the State of Kerala, India. It was constituted in 1967 with Chief Minister as Chairman and a non-official as part-time Vice-Chairman. The board assists the state government in formulating a development plan based on a scientific assessment of the resources (material, capital and human) available to the state. A comprehensive economic review of the state is prepared by the board every year.

Members

Finance Minister •  Minister for Home, Vigilance and Tourism •  Minister for Food, Civil Supplies and Animal Husbandry •  Minister for Transport •  Minister for Works •  Minister for Water Resources •

Member Secretary
Tikaram Meena
 IAS – IAS

Duties/Responsibilities
The official duties of the Board are performed by eight important divisions. They are:

 Plan Co-ordination Division
 Agriculture Division
 Evaluation Division
 Social Service Division
 Industry and Infrastructure Division
 Decentralized Planning Division
 Perspective Planning Division
 Information and Technology Wing

Plan Co-ordination Division

This Division co-ordinates all the activities concerned with the technical functions of the State Planning Board. It has been entrusted with the following functions:

 Assist in the preparation of Economic Review.
 Prepare reports as to the resource allocation of the state.
 Provide nuts and bolts regarding development plans to the state and Central governments.
 Prepare background papers and notes for discussion between Chief Minister of Kerala and Deputy Chairman of Planning Commission.

Agriculture Division

Agriculture Division deals with the Plan and Budget preparation of the Departments of Agriculture, Animal Husbandry, Dairy Development, Fisheries, Forestry and Wildlife, Co-operation, Water Resources, Ground Water Development and Command Area Development Authority. The Division also reviews the performance of the concerned sectors for the preparation of 'Economic Review' published by the State Planning Board. The projects for external /NCDC assistance are vetted in the Division before they are trainings /workshops /seminars conducted in connection with decentralised planning. The staff of the Division effectively participate in the vetting of the projects submitted for the approval of the State Level Expert Committee.

Evaluation Division

The Evaluation Division of the State Planning Board is functioning since 1969. The Division since its inception has undertaken Monitoring and Evaluation of two externally aided Projects: World Bank assisted Kerala Agricultural Development Project and EEC assisted Kerala Minor Irrigation Project. As part of the People's Campaign for the Ninth Five Year Plan of the State, evaluation studies on development programmes carried out by local bodies were taken up by this Division.

This Division performs the following duties:

 To study the modus operandi of existing government projects and programmes in Five Year Plans and Annual Plans.
 To find out the hurdles in implementation of government programmes and to ensure the beneficiaries the desired results.
 To increase the efficiency of government projects and to provide guidelines over such matters.

Social Service Division

Social Service Division deals with the subjects like education, medical and public health, water supply and sanitation, housing, information and publicity, labour and labour welfare, social welfare, nutrition etc.

Following are the functions of the division:

 Formulation of Five Year Plan and Annual Plan documents.
 Preparation of Annual Plan Budget.
 Providing technical assistance to the State Planning Board over the subjects concerned.

Industry and Infrastructure Division

The Division undertakes the following works.
 
 Formulation of Five Year Plan and Annual Plan.
 Preparation of Plan Budget.
 Preparation of Economy Review.
 Technical and expert opinion on matters referred to State Planning Board.
 Processing of Government files.
 Preparation of Status Paper on various sectors.
 Project appraisal.
 Preparation of reports of Plan committees and Working Groups.
 Review of implementation of Plan Schemes.
 Preparation of reports/notes on specific issues.
 Answering to LA interpellations.
 Mid term appraisal of Five Year Plans.

Decentralised Planning Division

The Division takes up the preparation of Five year plans, Annual Plans, Budget Estimates, Economic Review etc. relating to :-

 Community Development and Panchayats.
 Rural Development.
 Development of Scheduled Castes and Scheduled Tribes.
 Urban Development.
 Co-ordination of Activities of plan formulation and implementation by Local Governments.
 Preparation of Guidelines and instructions for Local level planning.

Perspective Planning Division

The Perspective Division is capable of doing the following works.

 Formulate Five Year Plans, Annual Plans and Annual Plan Budgets.
 Undertake studies on different subjects as and when entrusted to the division.
 Give replies and remarks on Govt. files and the letters from Government departments.

Information and Technology Wing

It is under the supervision of IT Wing that the official website of State Planning Board is monitored and updated. The Wing also provides 'Information Technology' based solutions to all the technical divisions and also to the administration sections of the State Planning Board. It also provides assistance for the computerisation of Economic Review, Plan Budget and also for the project details of the local bodies having undertaken in the District Planning Offices.

See also 
 List of Kerala State Government Organizations
 Peoples Planning in Kerala

References

External links
 Economic Review (of Kerala) from 1959 -2012
 Kerala state Planning Board : Official Website

Economic planning in India
Government finances in Kerala
1967 establishments in Kerala
Government agencies established in 1967